Aleš Kořínek (born 9 January 1983) is a Czech professional golfer and a former football player, who played as a goalkeeper for several clubs including Gambrinus liga's FC Tescoma Zlín. He started his golf career after retiring from football in 2013.

Football career 
He has represented the Czech Republic at under-21 level. He made his Gambrinus liga debut for Zlín against Příbram on 27 March 2005.

Golf career 
After retiring from football, he immediately asked for a professional golf status in Czech Republic. He soon moved among the top 10 players in Czech Republic. In 2020 he won on the Pro Golf Tour in Austria and the Grand Final of the Czech PGA Tour. In 2021 he was ranked among the top five Czech players.

Professional wins (3)

Pro Golf Tour wins (1)

*Note: The 2020 Raiffeisen Pro Golf Tour St. Pölten was shortened to 36 holes due to rain.

Czech PGA Tour wins (2)

References

External links

 

1983 births
Living people
Czech footballers
Czech Republic youth international footballers
Czech Republic under-21 international footballers
Association football goalkeepers
Czech First League players
FC Fastav Zlín players
Czech male golfers